Two Witches is a gothic rock band from Finland, formed in 1987. As with several other late 1980s bands (like Dream Theater and Nosferatu), Two Witches started basing the main part of their appearances and lyrics on vampiric imagery. The group was founded by Jyrki Witch and Anne Nurmi, who in 1993 left the band to start a professional relationship with Tilo Wolff and his group Lacrimosa. Their last work is the album Goodevil, published in 2014.

See also
Lacrimosa
Music of Finland

Notes

References

External links
Official Website
Argentine Fansite
Two Witches at Myspace
Two Witches at MusicMight
Two Witches at Discogs

Finnish musical groups
Finnish gothic rock groups
Finnish dark wave musical groups
Musical groups established in 1987